Magnus Vasa (25 July 1542 – 26 June 1595), prince of Sweden, Duke of Östergötland from 1555. Magnus was the third son of King Gustav Vasa. His mother was queen Margareta Leijonhufvud.

Biography
Magnus was the only of Gustav Vasa's sons, except for Karl and Sten, who died in infancy, that didn't become king of Sweden. In 1555, he was made Duke of Ostrogothia, Kinda and Ydre, Dalsland, Sundbo härad in Närke, Kåkind, Valla, and the major part of Vadsbo härad in Västergötland. As Duke of Ostrogothia, he lived permanently at Vadstena Castle in Vadstena.

Magnus suffered from a mental illness. The illness showed its first signs in 1563, and eventually became permanent. In 1574, the responsibility of his fiefs were taken over by his brother King John III, who managed them as his guardian because of his mental condition. A smaller part of them was granted to his other brother, Charles.

Magnus died at the Manorhouse of Kungsbro, outside Linköping, in 1595 and is buried in the Bridgettine Abbey Church in Vadstena.

Legacy
Many ballads and stories were inspired by Magnus and his alleged interest in mythological creatures such as fairies.

There are many stories about the "Mad Duke", for instance about how he saw a mermaid in the castle moat and threw himself out of a window, nearly drowning himself. There is no proof that this event ever took place, but the story might have evolved from an incident in 1563 when he fell in the moat, during the construction of the castle drawbridge. Geijer and Afzelius note that the alleged mermaid incident appears to have found its way into the ballad "Hertig Magnus och Hafsfrun" ("Herr Mannelig").

Issue 
Magnus was never married. He had three confirmed and acknowledged children outside of marriage.

With Valborg Eriksdotter:

 Lucretia Magnusdotter (Gyllenhielm) (1562–1624) married to nobleman Christoffer von Warnstedt

With Anna von Haubitz
 
 Helena Gyllenhielm (1572-1630) married to nobleman Wollmar Yxkull

Mother unknown:

 Virginia

Ancestry

Sources 
"Magnus Gustavsson Vasa". Historiesajten.
"Vadstena kloster och stad". Bengans historiasidor.

Citations 

House of Vasa
1542 births
1595 deaths
Magnus 1542
Burials at Vadstena Abbey
Dukes of Östergötland
Sons of kings